Henry Cass (24 June 1903 – 15 March 1989) was a British director, particularly prolific in film in the horror and comedy genres. Previously an actor, he was also a prolific stage director of classical theatre at the Old Vic in the 1930s.

In 1923, Lee DeForest filmed Cass for a short film Henry Cass Demonstration Film made in DeForest's Phonofilm sound-on-film process. The film was previewed at the Engineers Society of New York on 12 April 1923, and premiered at the Rivoli Theatre in New York on 15 April 1923 with 17 other short Phonofilms.

He was married to the actress Joan Hopkins.

Filmography
Lancashire Luck (1937)
29 Acacia Avenue (1945)
The Glen Is Ours (1946)
The Glass Mountain (1949)
No Place for Jennifer (1950)
Last Holiday (1950)
Young Wives' Tale (1951)
Castle in the Air (1952)
Father's Doing Fine (1952)
Breakaway (1955)
Windfall (1955)
Reluctant Bride (1955)
No Smoking (1955)
Bond of Fear (1956)
High Terrace (1956)
Professor Tim (1957)
The Crooked Sky (1957)
Booby Trap (1957)
Blood of the Vampire (1958)
Man Who Couldn't Walk (1960)
The Hand (1960)
Boyd's Shop (1960)
Mr. Brown Comes Down the Hill (1965)
Give a Dog a Bone (1965) MRA's Westminster Theatre, London
Happy Deathday (1968) also co-author of original play with Howard E. Koch the co-author was Peter Dunsmore Howard - journalist and leader of the MRA movement 1961 - 1965] MRA's Westminster Theatre, London

References

Bibliography
 Brian McFarlane & Anthony Slide. The Encyclopedia of British Film: Fourth Edition. Oxford University Press, 2013.

External links

Henry Cass Demonstration Film at SilentEra

1903 births
1989 deaths
English film directors
Alumni of RADA